Methodist University of Angola  is a private university located in Luanda, the capital of Angola.

It was founded in 2007.

See also

References

External links 

Universities in Angola
Schools in Luanda
Angola
Protestantism in Angola
2007 establishments in Angola
Educational institutions established in 2007